Everybody Loves Natti is an American television documentary series about Dominican singer Natti Natasha. It premiered on Amazon Prime Video on November 19, 2021.

Summary
The six-episode docuseries explores Natasha's relationship with her manager/fiancé Raphy Pina, recording her 2021 album Nattividad while she was pregnant, and personal obstacles she has faced, including fertility issues and her struggles as an undocumented Dominican immigrant in New York.

The series was created by Mona Scott-Young, and the showrunner is Alex Davies.

Cast
 Natti Natasha
 Raphy Pina
 Vida Isabelle Pina Gutiérrez
 Becky G
 Ariadna Gutiérrez
 Daddy Yankee
 Yovanna Ventura
 Prince Royce

Episodes

Release
The trailer was released on October 20, 2021. The series premiered on Prime Video on November 19, 2021.

References

External links 
 

English-language television shows
Amazon Prime Video original programming
2020s American documentary television series
Documentary television series about music
Television series by Amazon Studios
Reggaeton